Jacob L. Barron (born April 18, 1991) is an American soccer player who last played as a midfielder for Orange County Blues FC in USL Pro.

Career

College and amateur
Barron played two years of college soccer at University of California, Davis and two years at Penn State between 2009 and 2012.

Barron also used to teach at Brea Olinda High School, Algebra 2

Currently, Barron teaches Physical Education and Kinesiology at Sato Academy of Math and Science.  

While at college, Barron appeared for USL PDL club Reading United AC in 2012.

Professional career
Barron went undrafted in the 2013 MLS SuperDraft and 2013 MLS Supplemental Draft. He signed with USL PDL club Ottawa Fury for their 2013 season, where he made 13 appearances and scored 1 goal.

Barron trialed with MLS team Chivas USA in 2014 and made several appearances for Chivas USA's reserve team but never signed an MLS contract with the club.

Barron signed with USL Pro club Orange County Blues on July 17, 2014. Barron was released following the 2015 season having played 4 games in 2014 and 10 games in 2015. 
Jacob now coaches for Whittier College.

References

1991 births
Living people
American soccer players
 Penn State Nittany Lions men's soccer players
Reading United A.C. players
Ottawa Fury (2005–2013) players
Orange County SC players
Association football midfielders
Soccer players from California
USL League Two players
USL Championship players
Sportspeople from Orange, California
University of California, Davis alumni